The timeline of Malaysia Airlines Flight 370 lists events associated with the disappearance of Malaysia Airlines Flight 370—a scheduled, commercial flight operated by Malaysia Airlines from Kuala Lumpur International Airport to Beijing Capital International Airport on 8 March 2014 with 227 passengers and 12 crew. Air traffic control lost contact with Flight 370 less than an hour into the flight, after which it was tracked by military radar crossing the Malay Peninsula and was last located over the Andaman Sea. Analysis of automated communications between the aircraft and a satellite communications network has determined that the aircraft flew into the southern Indian Ocean, before communication ended shortly after 08:19 (UTC+8:00). The disappearance initiated a multi-national search effort that became the most expensive search in aviation history.

In the weeks after Flight 370's disappearance, the search focused on waters in Southeast Asia and an investigation into the disappearance was opened. After a week of searching, Malaysia announced that analysis of communications between the aircraft and a satellite communications network had found that Flight 370 continued to fly for several hours after it lost contact with air traffic control. Its last communication on the network was made along one of two arcs stretching north-west into Central Asia and southwest into the southern Indian Ocean. The northern arc was discounted and the focus of the search shifted to a remote area of the southern Indian Ocean.

On 18 March, a surface search in the southern Indian Ocean, led by Australia, began; it continued until 28 April and searched  of ocean. On 24 March 2014, Malaysia's Prime Minister announced that Flight 370 ended in the southern Indian Ocean with no survivors. In early April, an effort to find the signals emitted from underwater locator beacons (ULBs) attached to the aircraft's flight recorders, which have a 30- to 40-day battery life, was made. Some possible ULB detections were made and a seafloor sonar survey in the vicinity of the detections to scan the seafloor was initiated. The seafloor sonar survey ended on 28 May and scanned  of seafloor. Neither the surface search nor the seafloor sonar survey found any objects related to Flight 370.

In May 2014, planning for the next phase of the search was initiated. A bathymetric survey was carried out to measure the seafloor topography in the areas where the next phase was conducted; the survey charted  of seafloor topography and continued until December that year. An underwater search began in October 2014 but failed to recover anything of value and was suspended in January 2017 after searching  of the southern Indian Ocean.

Disappearance (8 March 2014)
Flight 370 took off from Kuala Lumpur International Airport at 00:42 local time (MYT; UTC+08:00) en route to Beijing Capital International Airport, where it was expected to arrive at 6:30 local time (CST; UTC+08:00). At 1:19, while Flight 370 was over the South China Sea between Malaysia and Vietnam, Malaysian air traffic control (ATC) instructed Flight 370 to contact the next ATC in Vietnam. The final voice contact from Flight 370 was made when its captain replied, "Good night. Malaysian Three Seven Zero". Two minutes later, the aircraft's transponder stopped functioning, causing it to disappear from ATC's secondary radar. Malaysian military radar continued to track the aircraft as it turned left, crossed the Malay Peninsula near the Malaysia–Thailand border, and travelled over the Andaman Sea.

At 2:25, the aircraft's satellite datalink, which was lost sometime between 01:07 and 02:03, was re-established. Thereafter, the aircraft's satellite data unit (SDU) replied to five hourly, automated status requests between 03:41 and 08:10, and two unanswered ground-to-aircraft telephone calls. At 08:19, the SDU sent a "log-on request" message to establish a satellite datalink, followed by the final transmission from Flight 370 eight seconds later. Investigators believe the 08:19 messages were made between the time of fuel exhaustion and the time the aircraft entered the ocean. After four hours of communication between several ATC centres, the Kuala Lumpur Aeronautical Rescue Coordination Centre was activated at 6:32. Malaysia Airlines released a press statement at 07:24, stating that contact with Flight 370 had been lost.

March 2014

A search and rescue effort is initiated in Southeast Asia on the morning Flight 370 disappears. Two passengers who boarded with stolen passports raise suspicion in the days after the disappearance, but they were later determined to be asylum seekers. On 9 March, some search efforts are launched in the Andaman Sea at the request of Malaysian officials, based on the possibility that the aircraft may have turned back from its flight path; the following day, officials confirm Flight 370 turned back towards Malaysia.

On 15 March, Malaysian Prime Minister Najib Razak announced that Flight 370 had remained in contact with a satellite communication network for several hours after it disappeared and that the aircraft was last located by military radar over the Andaman Sea. Analysis of these communications indicate the last communication with the aircraft was made when it was along one of two corridors; one stretching northwest to Central Asia and one stretching southwest into the southern Indian Ocean. The northern corridor was soon discounted and a search of a remote region of the southern Indian Ocean, led by Australia, began on 18 March. On 24 March, Malaysia Airlines and Najib announced that the flight had ended in the Southern Indian Ocean without survivors.

8 March At 5:30, the Aeronautical Rescue Coordination Centre (ARCC) at the Kuala Lumpur Area Control Center is activated. A search-and-rescue effort is initiated in the South China Sea and Gulf of Thailand around the location at which Flight 370 lost contact with air traffic control.

At 7:24, Malaysia Airlines issues a press statement saying contact with Flight 370 had been lost at 2:40—later changed to 1:30—and that a search and rescue effort had been initiated. After contacting the passengers' and crew's families, the passenger manifest is released.

In the morning, after the announcement of Flight 370s disappearance, the Royal Malaysian Air Force reviews data collected by military radar. They find that an unidentified aircraft, later determined to be Flight 370, had crossed the Malay Peninsula and was tracked until it left their radar's range at 2:22 while over the Andaman Sea. The satellite communications are not noticed until the following day and are not publicly disclosed for several days, while the radar data is not immediately acknowledged.

Austria and Italy confirm that two people listed on the passenger manifest—one from each country—were not on the flight. Both men's passports had been stolen in Thailand within the last two years.

The US National Transportation Safety Board sends a team of investigators to Malaysia.

Inmarsat hands over its data regarding communications with Flight 370 in response to a request from SITA, the company providing the datalink for Flight 370's communications equipment.

9 March By the end of the day, 40 aircraft and more than 24 vessels from several nations are involved in the search. Thailand's navy shifts the focus of its search to the Andaman Sea at the request of Malaysia. The Chief General of the Royal Malaysian Air Force announces that Malaysia is focused on a recording of radar and there is a "possibility" that Flight 370 turned around and travelled over the Andaman Sea.

Malaysia Airlines sends a team of more than 150 senior managers and caregivers to Beijing (most passengers were from China), where a centre is established for families of those on board to be comforted and await the latest news from the airline. A similar centre is opened in Kuala Lumpur. Malaysia Airlines also announces they are beginning to provide financial assistance to the families of those on board and are offering to transport them to Kuala Lumpur.

INTERPOL confirms the passports of the Austrian and Italian men were registered in its database of stolen passports and that no query of the database was made. Officials investigate CCTV video of these passengers taken before they boarded the flight. There are concerns about a possible link to terrorism, but officials say no such links have been found.

9–11 March Staff at Inmarsat look at the data they received from Flight 370 to determine whether they can assist the search. They find the aircraft continued flying for several hours after it lost contact with air traffic control and analyse it to determine the aircraft's location. By the morning of 11 March, they determine the aircraft was last located along one of two arcs and share the information with Malaysian investigators.

10 March The Royal Malaysian Air Force confirms Flight 370 made a "turn back".

11 March Malaysian police announce the two passengers using stolen passports were Iranian men who were likely migrants trying to emigrate to Germany. The tickets for both passengers ended in Frankfurt. The head of INTERPOL says, "the more information we get, the more we are inclined to conclude it is not a terrorist incident".

China activates the International Charter on Space and Major Disasters to aggregate satellite data to aid the search.

Inmarsat provides Malaysia with an initial analysis of the communications with Flight 370. Malaysia discusses the information with US investigators and agrees to allow the US to investigate the Inmarsat data. New Scientist publishes an article saying Flight 370 "sent at least two bursts of technical data back to the airline before it disappeared".

13 March An article published by the Wall Street Journal says Flight 370 continued to fly for hours after it was last seen by air traffic control, citing undisclosed US investigators. The article originally states that messages about engine performance continued to be sent to engine manufacturer Rolls-Royce; the newspaper soon corrects the article to say the claim is "based on analysis of signals sent by the Boeing 777's satellite-communication link ... the link operated in a kind of standby mode and sought to establish contact with a satellite or satellites. These transmissions did not include data." Malaysia denies the report.

Speaking at a press conference, White House spokesman Jay Carney says, "It is my understanding that based on some new information that's not necessarily conclusive—but new information—an additional search area may be opened in the Indian Ocean".

China criticizes Malaysia's handling of the search coordination and the flow of information.

14 March Inmarsat publicly acknowledges they recorded transmissions from the aircraft for several hours after it disappeared from air traffic control over the South China Sea.

Malaysia Airlines retires the MH370/MH371 flight number pair and begins using MH318/MH319.

15 March In a press conference, Malaysian PM Najib confirms Flight 370 remained in contact with Inmarsat's satellite communication network for several hours after it was lost by air traffic control. He says the ACARS messaging system was disabled early in the flight but the final satellite communication was made at 8:11. The final communication was made along one of two arcs; a "northern corridor" stretching from northern Thailand to Kazakhstan and a "southern corridor" from Indonesia into the southern Indian Ocean. Najib says the search in the South China Sea will be ended and the deployment of assets re-assessed. Malaysia sends diplomatic notes to all of the countries along the two corridors.

A team from Inmarsat arrives in Malaysia to assist in the investigation, which involves Malaysia, the US and the UK.

Investigators visit the homes of both pilots. A flight simulator in the home of Captain Shah is confiscated. Malaysian police chief Khalid Abu Bakar says it was the first visit to the pilots' homes but officials later say they visited the pilots' homes on 9 March.

17 March Australia agrees to lead the search along the southern corridor in the southern Indian Ocean, which mostly lies within Australia's concurrent aeronautical and maritime search and rescue regions. A shipping broadcast requesting assistance in the search is made.

Three merchant ships have joined the search.

Aircraft are dispatched to the area of the satellite images but do not find the objects. HMAS Success and a merchant vessel are en route to the area, joining a merchant vessel already there. Six merchant vessels have assisted in the search since a shipping broadcast was made on 17 March.

24 March Malaysia's Prime Minister Najib Razak announces at a press conference at 22:00 local time (Malaysia) that Flight 370 is presumed to have gone down in the southern Indian Ocean with no survivors. Shortly before Najib's announcement, Malaysia Airlines tells families it assumes "beyond reasonable doubt" there are no survivors. 

The search area is narrowed to the southern part of the Indian Ocean to the west and south-west of Australia. The northern search corridor north-west of Malaysia and the northern half of the southern search corridor—the waters between Indonesia and Australia—are definitively ruled out.

25 March Around 200 relatives of Flight 370 passengers protest outside the Malaysian embassy in Beijing; a rare event in China. Among the angry, distraught relatives' chants are "Liars!" and "Tell the truth! Return our relatives!" China demands Malaysia hand over the satellite data that led them to determine that Flight 370 ended in the southern Indian Ocean with no survivors. China sends a special envoy to Malaysia.

The UK Air Accidents Investigation Branch (AAIB) announces they have appointed an accredited representative to join the investigation team in Malaysia. As the state of manufacture of the aircraft's engines (UK manufacturer Rolls-Royce), the AAIB is authorized to join the investigation by ICAO protocol.

27 March Officials reveal that images captured by a Thai satellite on 24 March appear to show about 300 floating objects  in size.

29 March Malaysia announces that an international panel will be formed to investigate the Flight 370 incident.

30 March The Joint Agency Coordination Centre (JACC), headed by Angus Houston, is established to coordinate the search effort. It becomes operational the following day and assumes the role of coordinating the search effort and communicating with media, foreign governments, and between Australian government agencies from the Australian Maritime Safety Authority (AMSA).

April – May 2014 

In early April, an intense effort—the "acoustic search"— was made to detect the acoustic signals generated by underwater locator beacons (ULBs, also known as "pingers") attached to the flight recorders on Flight 370. After immersion in water, the ULBs emit an acoustic signal (also called a "ping") at a specific frequency once per second and have a battery life of 30–40 days. Three vessels, including one submarine and a vessel employing a towed pinger locator, tried to detect the acoustic signal along the 7th BTO arc—the centreline of the southern corridor—until 14 April, detecting several possible pings. Analysis of these signals determined they did not match the nominal characteristics of the ULBs; although unlikely, experts determine they may have originated from a damaged ULB. A sonar search of the seafloor begins on 14 April. A search of the ocean surface by aircraft and vessels ends on 28 April and the sonar search—the seafloor sonar survey—ends on 28 May, finding no debris from Flight 370. In late May, work on a bathymetric survey begins in preparation for the next phase of the search.

In early April, Malaysia submits a preliminary report to the ICAO, which is publicly released on 1 May along with recordings of conversations between Flight 370 and air traffic control. On 27 May, the complete log of transmissions between Flight 370 and Inmarsat via satellite are released, following weeks of public pressure.

1 April The International Air Transport Association (IATA), a major industry trade group, announces it will form a task group to enhance aircraft tracking to ensure further aircraft disappearances cannot happen.

2 April The Royal Navy survey vessel HMS Echo makes a possible ULB detection. After tests the following day, the detection is determined to be an artefact of the ship's sonar system.

4 April Chinese patrol ship Haixun 01 makes a possible ULB detection.

The ADV Ocean Shield deploys the first of its two towed pinger locators (TPLs).

Neither detection was recorded. HMS Echo and a submarine were later tasked to the location of the Haixun 01s detections, but unable to make any detections. It was determined the depth of the seafloor, surface noise and the equipment used by Haixun 01 made it unlikely the detections were from ULBs.

The ADV Ocean Shield deploys its second TPL, after the first exhibited problematic acoustic noise. Two detections are made. The first detection, made while the TPL was descending, lasted over two hours before it was lost. This detection was made at 33 kHz, while the ULBs on Flight 370's flight recorders emit a pulse at 37.5±1kHz. When the vessel passed the location in the opposite direction, a second detection lasting 13 minutes was made. Houston calls this the "most promising lead" thus far in the search.

Malaysia reorganizes its investigation team to consist of an airworthiness group, an operations group, and a medical and human factors group. The airworthiness group will examine issues related to maintenance records, structures and aircraft systems. The operations group will review flight recorders, operations and meteorology. The medical and human factors group will investigate psychological, pathological and survival factors. Malaysia also announces it has set up three ministerial committees—a Next of Kin Committee, a committee to organise a Joint Investigation Team, and a committee responsible for Malaysian assets deployed in the search effort.

6 April It has now been 30 days since Flight 370 presumably crashed in the southern Indian Ocean; the minimum battery life of the ULBs on Flight 370's flight recorders. The manufacturer of the ULBs predicts the maximum battery life is about 40 days.

6–16 April Sorties flown by Royal Australian Air Force AP-3C Orion aircraft deploy sonobuoys in locations near the 7th BTO arc where water depths are favourable for detection by sonobuoy. A possible ULB detection is made on 10 April with a sonobuoy close to the location of the ADV Ocean Shield; this is quickly determined to be unrelated to Flight 370's ULBs.

8 April ADV Ocean Shield makes two possible ULB detections, close to those of 5 April, lasting about five and a half minutes and seven minutes. The following day, Houston says the acoustic search will continue for as long as feasible because more and better quality detections will better pinpoint the aircraft's location—if indeed the detections were from Flight 370's ULBs. He also says the batteries will expire soon and the TPL can search six times more seafloor per day than the autonomous underwater vehicle carried aboard ADV Ocean Shield.

9 April Malaysia submits a five-page preliminary report to the International Civil Aviation Organization, the United Nations' civil aviation body. The report, dated 9 April but not publicly released until 1 May, includes a call for better tracking technology for commercial aircraft.

10 April A sonobuoy deployed near ADV Ocean Shield makes a possible ULB detection. The following day, officials say the detection is unlikely to be related to Flight 370.

13 April An oil slick is found  from possible ULB detections made by the ADV Ocean Shield. On 17 April, the JACC announces that tests of samples from the oil slick detected neither jet fuel nor hydraulic fluid.

14 April The ULBs have now been underwater for 38 days. Considering their batteries last 3040 days and that no possible detections have been made in almost a week, ADV Ocean Shield stops searching with the TPL and deploys a Bluefin-21, a torpedo-shaped autonomous underwater vehicle equipped with side-scan sonar, to scan the seafloor in the vicinity of the possible ULB detections. Analysis of the detections by the ADV Ocean Shield determine they do not match the nominal characteristics of the ULBs. Experts determine that although unlikely, they may have originated from a damaged ULB. The decision is made to search the seafloor in the vicinity of the detections (near ). During this new phase of the search—the seafloor sonar survey— the Bluefin-21 will be deployed with a programmed area to scan. Once back at the surface, it is recovered. It takes about four hours to change the batteries and download data from the mission, which is analysed aboard the ADV Ocean Shield.

The next day the ATSB determines that the object is unrelated to Flight 370.

28 April The surface search ends. In a press conference, Australian Prime Minister Tony Abbott says any debris would likely have become waterlogged and sunk and that the aircraft involved in the surface search were "operating at close to the limit of sensible and safe operation". The surface search in Southeast Asia and the Indian Ocean lasted 52 days, during 41 of which Australia coordinated the search. Over  of ocean surface was searched. In the Southern Indian Ocean, 29 aircraft from seven countries conducted 334 search flights; 14 ships from several countries were also involved. Although the seafloor sonar survey will continue, Abbott says plans for the next phase of the search, which will involve commercial companies and use towed sonar to more easily scan large areas of seafloor, are being developed.

1 May The interim report submitted earlier by Malaysia to the ICAO, dated 9 April, is released publicly, along with Flight 370's cargo manifest and seating plan, audio recordings and a transcript of communications between Flight 370 and Malaysian air traffic control.

2–22 May The seafloor sonar survey is suspended on 2 May as the AVD Ocean Shield returns to port to replenish supplies and personnel. Within two hours of its first deployment after returning to the search area on 13 May, Bluefin-21 develops a communications problem and is recovered. Spare parts from the UK were required and the AVD Ocean Shield returned to port to collect the parts. The problem is fixed and the seafloor sonar survey resumes on 22 May.

5 MayA tripartite meeting to discuss the next phase of the search is held with representatives from Australia (Warren Truss, Minister for Infrastructure and Regional Development), Malaysia (Hishammuddin Hussein, Defence Minister and acting Transport Minister), and China (Yang Chuantang, Transport Minister). During the press conference, Truss announces the US Navy has extended the contract for Bluefin-21 by four weeks.

13 May The Wall Street Journal publishes a commentary by Malaysian PM Najib, who defends Malaysia's response to the disappearance of Flight 370 and acknowledges his government "didn't get everything right".

21 May The Chinese vessel Zhu Kezhen leaves Fremantle to begin conducting the bathymetric survey. Because available bathymetric data for the area is of poor resolution, the survey is necessary for the safe operation of towed equipment that will be used during the next phase of the search.

27 May Malaysia releases the complete log of transmissions between Flight 370 and Inmarsat via satellite after weeks of public pressure.

28 May The seafloor sonar survey is completed. The following day, after analysis of data from the last mission, the ATSB announces the search in the vicinity of the acoustic detections is complete and the area can be discounted as the final location of Flight 370.

June – September 2014 
During this time, preparations are made for the next phase of the search, which was initially scheduled to begin in August, but did not commence until early October. On 26 June, Australia announces details for the next phase of the search—named the "underwater search"—despite the previous underwater towed pinger locator search and sonar survey. A bathymetric survey, begun in May, is necessary to map the seafloor topography before the underwater search. On 6 August, Australia awards a A$50 million tender to conduct the underwater search to Fugro; Malaysia is also contributing assets to the underwater search.

4 June A recording of an underwater sound that could have been that of Flight 370 hitting the water is released by researchers from Curtin University. The researchers believe the sound is probably unrelated to Flight 370. The lead researcher believes there is a small chance—perhaps 10 percent—that the acoustic event is related to Flight 370.

Australia opens the tender process for the underwater search. Bidders may submit proposals until 30 June.

10 June The ATSB hires Fugro, which will use the MV Fugro Equator, which will conduct the bathymetric survey alongside the Zhu Kezhen.

12 June The head of the Malaysian government committee to handle the needs of families of Flight 370 passengers announces that families of missing passengers will receive US$50,000 per person as an interim compensation.

26 June The ATSB releases a report, MH370 – Definition of Underwater Search Areas, discussing the methodology used to determine a new search area along the 7th BTO arc determined by the aircraft's communication with the Inmarsat satellite. A bathymetric survey of the region, already underway, will take around three months to complete. The new underwater search is expected to begin in August. Australia and Malaysia are working on a Memorandum of Understanding to cover financial and co-operation arrangements for search and recovery activities. Among other details, the ATSB report concludes an unresponsive crew or hypoxia event "best fit the available evidence" for the five-hour period of the flight as it travelled south over the Indian Ocean, likely on autopilot.

17 July Malaysia Airlines Flight 17 is shot down in a rebel-controlled area of Ukraine. Malaysia's Defence Minister assures the public that the additional incident will not detract from Malaysia's commitment to the search for Flight 370.

21 July Angus Houston, the head of the JACC, is appointed as Australia's special envoy in Ukraine to recover and repatriate bodies of Australian victims and ensure that a proper investigation of the crash of Flight 17 is initiated in accordance with international standards. Around this time, Houston leaves the agency; Deputy Coordinator Judith Zielke assumes leadership of the JACC and is later appointed its Chief Coordinator.

6 August Australia awards Fugro a A$50 million (US$46,6 million) contract to conduct the underwater search. Malaysia also commits vessels to the bathymetric survey and underwater search effort.

8 August Khazanah Nasional—the majority shareholder (69.37 percent) and a Malaysian state-run investment arm—announces its plan to purchase the remainder of the airline, thereby renationalising it. The move has been anticipated because of the airline's poor financial performance, which has been exacerbated by the combined effect on consumer confidence of the loss of Flights 370 and 17.

14 August An HSBC employee and her husband are arrested for allegedly siphoning 111,000 Malaysian ringgit (US$35,000) from bank accounts of several Flight 370 passengers in July.

20 September The Zhu Kezhen finishes bathymetric survey operations and begins its return passage to China.

October 2014 – June 2015

The underwater search commences on 6 October. The search involves four vessels: the GO Phoenix (6 October–20 June), Fugro Discovery (joined search 23 October), Fugro Equator (joined search 15 January), and Fugro Supporter (29 January–early May). The bathymetric survey was suspended on 17 December for the only remaining ship performing the survey, the Fugro Discovery, to be refitted to join the underwater search. During the bathymetyric survey,  of seafloor was charted.

On 8 October, the ATSB releases a report on the latest analysis of satellite communications, determining that the most likely location of the aircraft is south of the priority area identified in June. Officials say the search will begin in the area determined in the report. One year after the flight's disappearance, Malaysia declares Flight 370 an accident in accordance with the Chicago Convention in January 2015 and releases an interim report about Flight 370, focusing on factual information.

6 October The underwater search begins.

8 October Officials announce that the priority area to be searched is south of the area identified in the June ATSB report. The ATSB releases a supplement to the June report detailing the methodology behind refinements to the analysis of satellite communications, which resulted in the shift of the priority search area.

A peer-reviewed paper is published online by the Journal of Navigation—a journal of the Royal Institute of Navigation—by Inmarsat scientists who analysed the communications with Flight 370. The paper details the methodology of the calculations and the way continual changes, especially during the first few weeks of the search, resulted in the shifting search zones. It was released as an open access article with a Creative Commons Attribution license.

23 October Fugro Discovery commences search operations.

26 October Fugro Equator ends its bathymetric survey operations and leaves for Fremantle, where it will be refitted and mobilised to join GO Phoenix and Fugro Discovery in the underwater search. Over  of seafloor have been surveyed. If necessary, bathymetric survey operations may recommence in the future.

16 November Fugro Equator leaves Fremantle to resume work on the bathymetric survey after the arrival of equipment needed for the underwater search is delayed.

19 November The JACC releases a video explaining the work being carried out and the complexities of the underwater search.

17 December Fugro Equator finishes bathymetric survey work and leaves for Fremantle, where it will be refitted for the underwater search. The bathymetric survey charted  of seafloor. The ATSB releases a video titled Bathymetry of the MH370 Search Area, which presents a visualisation of the bathymetric data collected in the search area.

15 January 2015 Fugro Equator joins the search. It left Fremantle on 6 January.

18 January Search operations are suspended due to  waves caused by Tropical Cyclone Bansi. The search fully resumes by 23 January.

22 January The ATSB calls for expressions of interest for operations to recover Flight 370 so a recovery effort can be quickly and effectively mobilised if and when debris from the aircraft is located. The request will allow the ATSB to determine which organisations can supply equipment and expertise for the recovery effort.

29 January In accordance with Annexes 12 and 13 to the Chicago Convention, the Malaysian government officially declares the disappearance of Flight 370 an accident with no survivors.

A fourth vessel, joins the underwater search. It is equipped with a Kongsberg HUGIN 4500 autonomous underwater vehicle and will be able to search areas which cannot be effectively searched by the towfish used by the other vessels.

Search operations are resumed on 5 February by Fugro Equator, 8 February by Fugro Discovery, and 9 February by Fugro Supporter.

8 March On the first anniversary of the flight's disappearance, Malaysia's Ministry of Transport releases an interim report that is required by international protocol. The report focuses on factual information rather than analysis of possible causes of Flight 370's disappearance. One significant issue, not previously revealed publicly, is that the battery in the underwater locator beacon attached to the flight data recorder had expired in December 2013, which may have compromised its performance.

17 March The search resumes after being suspended for several days because of poor weather associated with ex-Tropical Cyclone Haliba.

2 April Fugro Discovery leaves port in Fremantle with a new towfish named Intrepid. After calibration trials at sea, the vessel will leave for the search area on 5 April.

16 April A tripartite meeting between Malaysian, Australian and Chinese officials is held. Over 60 percent of the  priority search area has been searched. Excluding significant delays, the search of the priority search area will be completed around May 2015. The officials agree that if no trace of the aircraft is found in the priority search area, the underwater search will be extended to an additional  of adjacent seafloor.

Angus Houston was appointed Knight of the Order of Australia in recognition of his military service and his "continued commitment to serve the nation in leadership roles, particularly the national responses to the [Malaysia Airlines Flight 370] and [Malaysia Airlines Flight 17] disasters".

Early May Fugro Supporter withdraws from the underwater search and travels to Fremantle, where the autonomous underwater vehicle (AUV) it operated is offloaded. Sea conditions during the austral winter are too rough to safely launch and recover the AUV and therefore, AUV operations will be suspended during the winter months. However, the AUV will be kept ready to assist the search at short notice.

Fugro Equator detected a cluster of small objects in an otherwise featureless region of seafloor. It was classified as a "Class 2" feature "of potential interest but unlikely to be related to MH370". Fugro Supporter was sent to investigate the site with its AUVs. Another AUV mission photographed the debris field, revealing the shipwreck and a field of cricket ball-sized coal. The images are sent to marine archaeologists to identify the wreck.

3–16 June Go Phoenix leaves the search area to return to port. The supporting frame of the vessel's towfish system was damaged while on the vessel's deck during rough seas; the vessel's supply of gasses for welding was exhausted before repairs could be completed. Repairs were completed and the vessel left port on 10 June, arriving in the search area on 16 June.

20 June GO Phoenix departs the search area to begin passage to Singapore, where it will be demobilized from search activities.

July 2015 – January 2018

On 29 July, a piece of marine debris is found on Réunion—an island in the western Indian Ocean—that resembled an aircraft component. The object is confirmed to be a flaperon from a Boeing 777. A search of the island and nearby waters is launched to locate other possible debris from Flight 370. Other marine debris found on Réunion over the following days is suspected of originating from Flight 370, but only the flaperon is conclusively linked to Flight 370. On 5 August, Malaysia's Prime Minister confirms that the first object discovered is from Flight 370; confirmation from French officials comes on 3 September. In the subsequent months several pieces of debris are determined to be highly likely to have come from Flight 370.

The items are transported the following day to Toulouse, France for analysis.

31 July A Chinese water bottle and an Indonesian cleaning product are found on Réunion in the vicinity of the location where the aircraft flaperon and suitcase were found.

2 August The Malaysian Ministry of Transportation announces that the first object discovered is a flaperon from a Boeing 777; they state that the verification was made with investigators from France, Malaysia, Boeing, and the US NTSB.

5 August The Malaysian Prime Minister announces that experts have "conclusively confirmed" that the flaperon found on 29 July is from Flight 370; the debris is the first physical evidence that Flight 370 ended in the Indian Ocean.

6 August Malaysia's Transport Ministry claims that window panes and aircraft seat cushions have washed up on Réunion. This claim is disputed by France.

7 August Maldivian police investigate claims that plane debris has washed up on North Malé Atoll, Maldives. Authorities in nearby Mauritius have also begun searching for debris and sent a piece of a bag found on Îlot Gabriel for inspection.

12 August A packet of Malaysian noodles were found in South Australia and a Malaysia Airlines baggage tag was found in Nowra, New South Wales. The items were turned into Australian authorities, who noted that "It's very challenging for investigators to find something that can be linked to the aircraft – it would really have to be some form of debris from the aircraft. But we encourage people to bring anything unusual or out of place forward. It's far better that we investigate and rule it out."
The debris from North Malé is flown to Malaysia for investigation.
Malaysia's government news agency published a new theory that Flight 370 made a soft landing on the water, floated for a while on the surface, and then sank mostly in one piece. Many experts also believe in this theory.

3 September French investigators affirm "with certainty" that the aircraft flaperon discovered on 29 July is from Flight 370, due to a serial number that matched the records of the Spanish manufacturer that produced portions of the flaperon.

8 September Australia's Commonwealth Scientific and Industrial Research Organisation (CSIRO) releases a drift analysis that concludes that the finding of the flaperon on Réunion is consistent with the current search area for Flight 370.

3 December The ATSB publishes a report, based on analysis by Australia's Defence Science and Technology Group (DST Group). The analysis determined that the most probable location of Flight 370 when it entered the water is within the southern half of the existing search zone. The JACC also releases a pre-publication draft of Bayesian methods in the search for MH370, a book by the DST Group detailing their analysis.
Australian Deputy Prime Minister Warren Truss announces the number of vessels in the search would be doubled to four, and that the undersea search was expected to be completed by June 2016.

5 December The  arrives in the search area, becoming the third vessel actively involved in the search. The Havila Harmony is carrying an AUV that will be deployed to search the most challenging underwater terrain.

 19 December A second 19th-century shipwreck is discovered.

2 January 2016 The AUV aboard the MV Havila Harmony is used to produce a high-resolution sonar image of an "anomalous sonar contact" made on 19 December that analysis suggested to be man-made and possibly a shipwreck. The AUV sonar imagery confirms the object is a shipwreck.

24 January The towfish being used by the Fugro Discovery collides with an undersea mud volcano. The towing cable breaks and the towfish along with 4,500 metres of towing cable sink to the seafloor.

29 January Australia announces that a fourth ship will join the search. The Dong Hai Jiu 101 is being supplied by China and will employ a towfish operated by Phoenix International Holdings and Hydrospheric Solutions, both companies with previous experience in the search for Flight 370. The ship is expected to join the search in late February.

2 March Media report the discovery of an object, a suspected horizontal stabilizer, found on a sandbar in Mozambique, that may have originated from a Boeing 777. The object, found by an American tourist the preceding weekend, is flown to Australia for examination.

24 March Australian Transport Minister Darren Chester announces that two pieces of debris, the object reported discovered earlier in March as well as an object found in Mozambique by a South African tourist in December 2015, are both "almost certainly" from MH370.
Part of an engine cowling is found on the coast of South Africa.

2 April A piece of debris that is suspected to be a bulkhead from inside the cabin of an aircraft is discovered on the coast of Rodrigues, an autonomous island in Mauritius.

12 May Malaysian Transport Minister Liow Tiong Lai announces that the engine cowling discovered on 24 March in South Africa and the bulkhead discovered on 2 April in Rodrigues are "almost certainly" from Flight 370.

24 June The Australian Transport Minister, Darren Chester, said that a piece of aircraft debris was found on Pemba Island, off of the coast of Tanzania. It was handed over to the authorities so that experts from Malaysia can determine whether it is part of the aircraft. The Australian government released photos of the piece, believed to be an outboard wing flap, on 20 July.

22 July A meeting of senior ministers from Australia, China, and Malaysia is held in Putrajaya, Malaysia. Fugro, the survey company hired to search for the plane, believe that the wrong area may have been targeted.

 27 July Scientists from the Euro-Mediterranean Center on Climate Change publish a paper analysing where wreckage was found with ocean drift. This predicted an area for the crash site, further north than the ATSB search area.

15 September Malaysia's transport ministry confirms that the outboard wing flap discovered on 24 June on Pemba Island originated from Flight 370, due to identifying part numbers and date stamps.

20 December The ATSB releases a report suggesting a new  search area north of the current search area. The report noted that "if this area were to be searched, prospective areas for locating the aircraft wreckage, based on all the analysis to date, would be exhausted." However, the Australian government stated that the search would not be extended beyond the current search area without new evidence.

The search is reported to have cost $160 million.

January 2018 A second search was launched by Ocean Infinity, however the search was ended sixth months later without success.

Notes

References

External links 

 Joint Agency Coordination Centre
 Australian Transport Safety Bureau –  page for the MH370 search
 Timeline of AMSA's involvement

Malaysia Airlines Flight 370
Articles containing video clips

pt:Voo Malaysia Airlines 370#Cronologia do incidente